The Pra is a river in the Ryazan and Moscow Oblasts in Russia, a left tributary of the Oka. The Pra River freezes up in late November and stays under the ice until April.

References

Rivers of Ryazan Oblast
Rivers of Moscow Oblast